Strong Arm of The Law is the third studio album by English heavy metal band Saxon. It was released in 1980, seven months after Wheels of Steel, and debuted on the UK chart at #11.

The last track, "Dallas 1 PM" concerns the assassination of John F. Kennedy. "We thought, 'Should we put one shot in there or should we put three?'" recalled singer Biff Byford. "In the end we went down the conspiracy theory route and had three shots." According to guitarist Graham Oliver, the title track was inspired by an incident where the band was driving in Whitehall and was subsequently pulled over and searched by the security detail of then British prime minister, Margaret Thatcher.

Reception

Eduardo Rivadavia of AllMusic rated the album four and a half out of five stars. He called it "equally timeless" to its predecessor, Wheels of Steel and commented, "All the right ingredients pretty much fell into place for Saxon on this amazing record, and though it lacked as many clear-cut hits as its predecessor, Strong Arm of the Law'''s unmatched consistency from start to finish makes it the definitive Saxon album in the eyes of many fans and critics." After their peak with Wheels of Steel'', Canadian journalist Martin Popoff was a little disappointed, calling the album "comfortable and nostalgic if never remarkable", but "definitely betraying Saxon's lack of ideas"; despite their "stripped, basic and enthusiastic delivery of metal... creatively Saxon was getting left in the dust, both looking and sounding a bit like Slade."

UK Track listing

US Track listing

Personnel
Saxon
Biff Byford – vocals
Graham Oliver – guitar
Paul Quinn – guitar
Steve Dawson – bass guitar
Pete Gill – drums

Production
Pete Hinton – producer
Will Reid Dick – engineer
Saxon – arrangements
Blechner Poxon – management

Charts

Album

Singles

Certifications

References

Saxon (band) albums
1980 albums
Carrere Records albums